Flamita (born November 30, 1994) is a Mexican luchador enmascarado or masked professional wrestler. In addition to working for promotions such as Ring Of Honor, (ROH) Lucha Libre AAA World Wide, (AAA) and Desastre Total Ultraviolento (DTU) in his native country, Flamita is also known for his work in the Japanese Dragon Gate promotion, where he is a former Open the Brave Gate and Open the Triangle Gate Champion. Flamita is a third-generation professional wrestler. His real name is not a matter of public record as is often the case with masked wrestlers in Mexico. Dave Meltzer has called Flamita "one of the best [high-flying wrestlers] in the world", comparing him to Rey Mysterio.

Professional wrestling career

Early career (2009–2012)
Both Flamita's father and grandfather were professional wrestlers; his father worked under the ring name El Retador ("The Challenger"), while his grandfather was known as Toro Negro ("Black Bull"). After five years of training, he made his professional wrestling debut on December 12, 2009, under the ring name Flamita ("Little Flame"), which he got from his uncle, who had wrestled under the name Flama Roja ("Red Flame").

Flamita started his career wrestling on the Mexican independent circuit, becoming best known for his work in the Desastre Total Ultraviolento (DTU) promotion, where he captured the Alto Rendimiento Championship on two occasions. In addition, he also worked for Alianza Universal de Lucha Libre (AULL), where he won the AULL Lightweight Championship in April 2012, only to vacate it two months later.

Lucha Libre AAA World Wide (2011–2016)
On June 26, 2011, Flamita made his debut for one of Mexico's top promotions, Lucha Libre AAA World Wide (AAA), at a benefit show co-produced by AAA and DTU. Throughout 2013, Flamita worked several AAA shows, mainly wrestling either dark or opening matches. He was also part of the short-lived roster split, being recruited as part of the AAA Fusion roster. AAA reportedly wanted Flamita to take over the role of Octagón Jr., but he turned down the offer in order to continue working in Japan.

Following his success in Japan and months of rumors that AAA were interested in signing him full-time, Flamita returned to the promotion on July 10, 2015, now working under the new ring name Fireball and teaming with Ludxor in a tag team match, where they defeated Daga and Steve Pain. Following the appearance, Flamita announced he had not signed a contract with AAA and was still undergoing negotiations with the promotion. Flamita started working for AAA as a regular in November 2015.

On March 4, 2016, Flamita was repackaged as the second Octagón Jr. He was quickly branded a "fraud" by Octagón, the luchador the character was based on, who stated that he had not given AAA the permission to introduce another Octagón Jr. On April 10, Octagón Jr. was confronted and unmasked by Octagón during an autograph signing. Three days later, Octagón introduced his own Octagón Jr. or "Hijo de Octagón", supposedly portrayed by his son. On April 27, Flamita stated that out of respect toward Octagón, he was dropping the Octagón Jr. gimmick, leaving AAA and returning to the independent circuit under the Flamita name.

Dragon Gate (2013–2019)

In October 2013, it was announced that Flamita, along with fellow Mexican Rocky Lobo, had been signed by the Japanese Dragon Gate promotion. He made his debut for the promotion on October 26, 2013, as part of the Millennials stable. On December 5, Flamita and his stablemates Eita and T-Hawk first won a one-night tournament to become the number one contenders to the Open the Triangle Gate Championship and then defeated Mad Blankey (BxB Hulk, Cyber Kong and Yamato) that same night to become the new champions. They lost the title to Jimmyz (Jimmy Susumu, Mr. Kyu Kyu Naoki Tanizaki Toyonaka Dolphin and Ryo "Jimmy" Saito) on December 22. On March 16, 2014, Flamita won his first singles title in Dragon Gate, when he defeated Genki Horiguchi H.A.Gee.Mee!! for the Open the Brave Gate Championship. He held the title for the rest of the year, successfully defending it against the likes of Naoki Tanizaki, Kzy, and Dragon Kid at the promotion's biggest show of the year, Kobe Pro Wrestling Festival on July 20. One of his title defenses also took place back in Mexico at a DTU event. On December 28, Flamita's ninth title defense ended in a disqualification, after he was unmasked by his challenger Punch Tominaga. Following the win, Flamita refused to accept the title belt, leaving it behind him in the ring. Three days later, Dragon Gate's office declared Flamita's reign over and title vacant.

Flamita returned to Dragon Gate three months later and on March 24, 2015, received a rematch for the Open the Brave Gate Championship, but was defeated by the defending champion, Akira Tozawa. On August 6, Millennials were forced to disband, when Flamita, Eita and T-Hawk were defeated in a three-way trios match. On October 4, Flamita joined the Dia.Hearts stable. During Flamita's hiatus from Dragon Gate, Dia.Hearts was disbanded. On July 2, 2016, Flamita returned to Dragon Gate, joining the Tribe Vanguard stable.

Lucha Underground (2016)
In early 2016, while he was still in AAA, Flamita took part in the season two tapings of Lucha Underground under the ring name "Night Claw". His debut episode aired on June 22, 2016.

Return to the independent circuit (2016–present)
Following his departure from AAA, Flamita made his Arena México debut on June 9, 2016, working an event held by Lucha Libre Elite. On September 1, 2017, Flamita made his debut for the Southern California-based Pro Wrestling Guerrilla (PWG), entering the 2017 Battle of Los Angeles tournament, from which he was eliminated in the first round by Ricochet.

Ring of Honor (2019-2021)
With the partnership with ROH and Rev Pro Flamita will debut in the UK in the Honor United Tour. On April 10, 2021 on Ring of Honor Television, Jay Lethal and Jonathan Gresham defeated Bandido and Flamita in a tag team match, After the match, Flamita walks out on Bandido and says no more, Splitting up the tag team.

Championships and accomplishments
Alianza Universal de Lucha Libre
AULL Lightweight Championship (1 time)
The Crash
The Crash Cruiserweight Championship (1 time)
The Crash Tag Team Championship (1 time) – with Bandido
Desastre Total Ultraviolento
DTU Alto Rendimiento Championship (2 times)
Dragon Gate
Open the Brave Gate Championship (1 time)
Open the Triangle Gate Championship (1 time) – with Eita and T-Hawk
Progress Wrestling
Progress Tag Team Championship (1 time) – with Bandido
Pro Wrestling Illustrated
Ranked No. 177 of the top 500 singles wrestlers in the PWI 500 in 2021
Ring of Honor
ROH World Six-Man Tag Team Championship (1 time) – with Rey Horus and Bandido

References

External links
Dragon Gate profile 

1994 births
Living people
Masked wrestlers
Mexican male professional wrestlers
Professional wrestlers from Mexico City
Unidentified wrestlers
21st-century professional wrestlers
ROH World Six-Man Tag Team Champions
Open the Brave Gate Champions
Open the Triangle Gate Champions
PROGRESS Tag Team Champions